Kota Rani (d. 1344) was the last ruler of the Hindu Lohara dynasty in Kashmir. She was also the last female ruler of Kashmir. She was regent during the minority of her son in 1323−1338, and ruled as monarch in 1338−1339. She was deposed by Shah Mir, who became the first Muslim ruler of Kashmir.

Life

Kota Rani was the daughter of Ramachandra, the commander-in-chief of Suhadeva, the king of Lohara dynasty in Kashmir.  Ramachandra had appointed an administrator, Rinchan, a Ladakhi. Rinchan became ambitious. He sent a force in the fort, in the guise of merchants, who took Ramachandra's men by surprise. Ramachandra was killed and his family was taken prisoner.

To earn local support, Rinchan appointed Rawanchandra, the son of Ramachandra, as administrator of Lar and Ladakh, and married his sister Kota Rani. He employed Shah Mir as a trusted courtier, who had entered Kashmir earlier and had been given an appointment in the government.
Rinchan converted to Islam and adopted the name of Sultan Sadruddin. He died as a result of an assassination after ruling for three years.

Reign
Kota Rani was first appointed as a regent for Rinchan's young son. Later she was persuaded to marry Udayanadeva by the elders.  Udayanadeva died in 1338.

Kota Rani had two sons. Rinchan's son was under the charge of Shah Mir and Udayanadeva's son was taught by Bhatta Bhikshana. Kota Rani became the ruler in her own right, and appointed Bhatta Bhikshana as her prime minister.

Shah Mir pretended to be sick, and when Bhatta Bhikshana visited him, Shah Mir jumped out of his bed and killed him.  According to the historian Jonaraja, she committed suicide and offered her intestines to him as a wedding gift. According to the Kashmiri historian Jonaraja, Shah Mir killed both of her sons.

Legacy
She was very intelligent and a great thinker. She saved the city of Srinagar from frequent floods by getting a canal constructed, named after her and called "Kute Kol". This canal gets water from Jhelum River at the entry point of city and again merges with Jhelum river beyond the city limits.

In popular culture
 Rakesh Kaul's historical novel The Last Queen of Kashmir is based on Kota Rani's life and legend.
 In August 2019, Reliance Entertainment and Phantom Films announced that they would be making a movie on Kota Rani.

See also
 Rajatarangini
 Sayyid Dynasty
 Razia Sultana
 Queen Didda
 Rinchan

References

Bibliography
 

Indian female royalty
Rulers of Kashmir
14th-century Indian women
14th-century Indian people
14th-century women rulers
Queens regnant in Asia
1344 deaths